Amolbos was a town of Magnesia in ancient Thessaly.

Its site is unlocated.

References

Populated places in ancient Thessaly
Former populated places in Greece
Ancient Magnesia
Lost ancient cities and towns